Dinner for Schmucks is a 2010 American comedy film directed by Jay Roach and based on Francis Veber's 1998 French film Le Dîner de Cons.

Starring Steve Carell and Paul Rudd, with Jemaine Clement, Jeff Dunham, Bruce Greenwood, and Ron Livingston in supporting roles, the film tells the story of a rising executive who finds out that his work superiors host a dinner celebrating the idiocy of their guests. He questions it when he is invited, just as he befriends a man who would be the perfect guest.

Dinner for Schmucks was released in theaters on July 30, 2010, by Paramount Pictures and DreamWorks Pictures and grossed $86.9 million against a $69 million budget.

Plot
Tim Conrad finds a way to get wealthy businessman Martin Mueller as a client. Impressed by Tim's ingenuity, his boss Lance Fender says he is a candidate for a promotion but wants to get to know him better. He invites him to a dinner in which he must find and bring an eccentric person with a special talent to be mocked by the executives; the winner earns a trophy and the executive that brought him or her gets glory.

Tim excitedly tells his long-time girlfriend, Julie, about the possible promotion and dinner but she is offended by the idea of inviting strange people to a dinner just to mock them, telling him to refuse the invitation.

The next day, Tim accidentally hits Barry Speck with his car as he is trying to retrieve a dead mouse from the road. Witnessing Barry's bizarre behavior, including taxidermy and arranging mice into dioramas based on famous artwork, "Mousterpieces", Tim realizes he is the perfect idiot for the dinner. Julie finds out Tim is inviting Barry to the dinner and leaves their apartment after Tim insists he must go, as he has to in order to continue providing for them.

Barry shows up at Tim's apartment thinking the dinner event was that very evening, accidentally inviting over Darla, a female pro wrestler Tim slept with once, who is obsessed with him. After scolding Barry for inviting Darla over, explaining who she is, Barry takes it upon himself to keep Darla away from Tim, confusing Julie for her. Their conversation leads her to believe Tim is cheating on her and she once again leaves. When Tim realizes what Barry has done, he believes Julie may be at Kieran Vollard's, an artist whose work she is selling at a gallery and who has expressed interest in her.

Tim and Barry sneak into Vollard's apartment, but learn he is at his ranch. They return to Tim's and Barry lets Darla in. Julie calls and asks Tim if he's having an affair, Darla steals the phone, stuffing it down her pants. The call ends abruptly, making Julie believe he is cheating. As Tim hides in his bedroom trying to reach Julie, Darla and Barry have a bar-style fight, scaring Darla away.

Barry takes Tim to his IRS office to find Vollard's ranch address, meeting Barry's boss and rival, Therman Murche. He claims to have the "talent" of mind control, and has authored a book about it. He also had stolen Barry's ex-wife after Barry caught them cheating. Barry, Tim and Therman have a strange encounter, which results in Tim getting audited. Tim leaves the next day for a brunch with Mueller and his wife, but Barry crashes it, bringing Darla along pretending to be Julie. Tim is pushed into asking Darla to marry him, and Julie walks in during the proposal. Tim and Barry chase Julie down to Vollard's ranch, where Tim finally snaps at Barry about his actions.

To his surprise, Tim finds Barry already at the dinner party, having forgiven Tim for his outburst. Barry's antics along with his "Mousterpieces" are a hit with the group, and he is seemingly a shoo-in for the trophy. Unexpectedly, however, Therman arrives as the "guest" of another executive, embarrassing Barry with his mind control. Tim then tells Barry everything and, after some encouragement, gets Barry to defeat Therman by using his own powers of "brain control".

Fender congratulates Tim on bringing Barry to the dinner as his idiot, and Tim, offended, insults Fender before defending Barry. The other guests then learn they were brought to the dinner only to be mocked, leading to a chaotic brawl between the guests and the executives. The brawl ultimately leads to Mueller losing his finger and prized family ring and Fender's mansion burning down.

After returning to Tim's apartment, Tim and Julie manage to reconcile with Barry's help. Tim is fired, as is Julie, after Barry makes Vollard realize it would be a problem to have her continue working for him. Tim and Julie marry, Barry gets to have sex with Darla and also does some artwork with Vollard while Therman writes a book in a mental hospital.

Cast

Production
The budget for the film was split between the distributor Paramount Pictures, as well as DreamWorks Pictures and Spyglass Entertainment. The production budget was $69 million, but with tax credits the cost came in at $62.7 million. Filming of the dinner scene took place at the same location that was used for Wayne Manor in the 1960s Batman television series.

Dinner for Schmucks is the American adaptation of the French film Le Dîner de Cons (literally, "The Dinner of Idiots"). The film retains many familiar elements of the original, with the basic plot, including the involvement of the taxation authorities and the love triangle around the main character Tim. In the remake, however, Tim is made much more sympathetic (this is the first dinner he has participated in, and he is not in fact having an affair or deliberately cheating on his taxes), and the actual dinner is shown. Director Roach describes the film as "inspired by" the original rather than a remake.

Title
Debate ensued about the title's usage of the Yiddish word schmucks which is a mild cultural insult similar to "idiot" which technically refers to 'male genitals'.
Debbie Schlussel asked whether the title should have been Dinner for Schlemiels as it would better describe the clumsy character played by Steve Carell.
Responding in The New York Times, critic Michael Cieply determined that the intent was to be ambiguous as to which of the two main characters, played by Steve Carell and Paul Rudd, was the intended idiot.

In The Forward, Laura Hodes suggested that 'schmucks' correctly referred instead to the behavior of the film's antagonists, the bosses of Rudd's character.

Release
Dinner for Schmucks was pushed back a week to July 30, 2010, to avoid competition with Salt and Inception.

Marketing
As part of promoting the film, the website Funny or Die featured videos of Jemaine Clement in character as Kieran Vollard.

The film's first trailer debuted with Date Night, Death at a Funeral, and A Nightmare on Elm Street. The second trailer was shown before select screenings of The A-Team, Get Him to the Greek, Grown Ups, and Inception.

Box office
Dinner for Schmucks made $8.4 million on its first day, ranking number two at the box office, behind Inception. The film earned $23.5 million on its opening weekend, placing it second overall for the weekend of July 30 to August 1. It ultimately grossed $73 million in North America and $13.4 million internationally, for a total of $86.4 million worldwide. The film was released in the United Kingdom on September 3, 2010, and opened on #2, behind The Last Exorcism.

Home media
Dinner for Schmucks was released on DVD and Blu-ray Disc on January 4, 2011.

Reception

On Rotten Tomatoes the film holds an approval rating of 42% based on 191 reviews, with an average rating of 5.40/10. The site's critical consensus reads: "It doesn't honor its source material—or its immensely likable leads—as well as it should, but Dinner for Schmucks offers fitfully nourishing comedy." On Metacritic, the film has a weighted average score of 56 out of 100, based on 37 critics, indicating "mixed or average reviews". Audiences polled by CinemaScore gave the film an average grade of "B" on an A+ to F scale.

Roger Ebert of the Chicago Sun-Times gave the film 3 out of 4:

Accolades

In 2010, Steve Carell was nominated for the Satellite Award for Best Actor for his performance as Barry Speck.

References

External links

 
 
 
 

2010 films
2010s screwball comedy films
American remakes of French films
American screwball comedy films
American slapstick comedy films
DreamWorks Pictures films
Films about animal rights
Films about human rights
Films directed by Jay Roach
Films set in California
Paramount Pictures films
Reliance Entertainment films
Spyglass Entertainment films
Films scored by Theodore Shapiro
2010 comedy films
Films produced by Walter F. Parkes
2010s English-language films
2010s American films
Films based on works by Francis Veber